Adiaké Department is a department of Sud-Comoé Region in Comoé District, Ivory Coast. In 2021, its population was 88,006 and its seat is the settlement of Adiaké. The sub-prefectures of the department are Adiaké, Assinie-Mafia, and Etuéboué.

History

Adiaké Department was created in 1998 as a second-level subdivision via a split-off from Aboisso Department. At its creation, it was part of Sud-Comoé Region.

Adiaké Department was divided in 2008 with the split-off creation of Tiapoum Department.

In 2011, districts were introduced as new first-level subdivisions of Ivory Coast. At the same time, regions were reorganised and became second-level subdivisions and all departments were converted into third-level subdivisions. At this time, Adiaké Department remained part of the retained Sud-Comoé Region in the new Comoé District.
In 2014, the population of the sub-prefecture of Adiaké was 44,257.

Villages
The xx villages of the sub-prefecture of Adiaké and their population in 2014 are:

Notes

Departments of Sud-Comoé
1998 establishments in Ivory Coast
States and territories established in 1998